2011 I-League 2nd Division Final Round involves eight teams, two from every group of 2011 I-League 2nd Division plus Shillong Lajong FC and Sporting Clube de Goa.  Currently United Sikkim FC, Southern Samity, Mohammedan SC, Royal Wahingdoh FC, Vasco SC and Ar-Hima FC   have qualified for Final round.

The top two teams at the end of final round qualify for 2011-12 I-league only if they complete all AFC requirements.

Teams and location

Standings

Group table

References

External links
- kolkatafootball.com  2nd divn I-League all

I-League 2nd Division final rounds